The 2019 Engie Open Saint-Gaudens Occitanie was a professional tennis tournament played on outdoor clay courts. It was the twenty-third edition of the tournament which was part of the 2019 ITF Women's World Tennis Tour. It took place in Saint-Gaudens, France between 13 and 19 May 2019.

Singles main-draw entrants

Seeds

 1 Rankings are as of 6 May 2019.

Other entrants
The following players received wildcards into the singles main draw:
  Audrey Albié
  Harmony Tan
  Eden Silva
  Margot Yerolymos

The following player received entry using a junior exempt:
  Cori Gauff

The following players received entry from the qualifying draw:
  Tessah Andrianjafitrimo
  Gréta Arn
  Anna Danilina
  Jana Fett
  Valentina Ivakhnenko
  Nina Stojanović

The following players received entry as lucky losers:
  Marie Benoît
  Lucia Bronzetti

Champions

Singles

 Anna Kalinskaya def.  Ana Bogdan, 6–3, 6–4

Doubles

 Martina Di Giuseppe /  Giulia Gatto-Monticone def.  Anna Kalinskaya /  Sofya Lansere, 6–1, 6–1

References

External links
 2019 Engie Open Saint-Gaudens Occitanie at ITFtennis.com
 Official website 

2019 ITF Women's World Tennis Tour
2019 in French tennis
Open Saint-Gaudens Occitanie